Be with You may refer to:

Film and TV
 Be with You (2004 film), a Japanese romantic fantasy film
 Be with You (2018 film), a South Korean film
 Be with You (TV series), a 2015 Taiwanese television series

Music
 Be with You (album), a 2012 album by Megumi Nakajima
 "Be with You" (The Bangles song), 1988
 "Be with You" (Enrique Iglesias song), 1999
 "Be with You" (Atomic Kitten song), 2002
 "Be with You" (Director song), 2007
 "Be with You" (BoA song), 2008
 "Be with You" (Erasure song), 2011
 "Be with You", a 2003 song by Beyoncé from Dangerously in Love
 "Be with You", a 2003 song by Carmen Rasmusen from the soundtrack to Pride & Prejudice: A Latter-Day Comedy
 "Be with You", a 2008 song by Akon from Freedom

See also
 "To Be with You", a 1991 song by Mr. Big